Usta is an unincorporated community in Perkins County, in the U.S. state of South Dakota. The community lies on South Dakota Highway 73.

History
Usta was laid out in 1931. A post office called Usta was established in 1931, and remained in operation until 1942.

References

Unincorporated communities in Perkins County, South Dakota
Unincorporated communities in South Dakota